Viking Soul Food is a Scandinavian restaurant in Portland, Oregon.

Description 
Viking Soul Food (VSF) is a Scandinavian restaurant which has operated from an Airstream trailer on Belmont Street, in the Bite On Belmont food cart pod in southeast Portland's Sunnyside neighborhood.

In 2020, Christen McCurdy of Willamette Week said the Black-owned restaurant serves "Scandinavian-soul fusion" food, and the Portland Mercury's Robert Ham described the menu as "Nordic-inspired" comfort food. The menu includes lefse (potato-based Norwegian flatbread) with meatballs with gravy or smoked salmon, dill, greens, and creme fraiche, as well as seafood chowder and lingonberry iced tea.

History 
Megan Walhood and Jeremy Daniels have operated VSF since August 2010. The restaurant appeared on season 32, episode 11 ("From Vikings to Wings") of the Food Network's Diners, Drive-Ins, and Dives. In 2014, the duo announced plans to close and sell the Airstream.

Some VSF menu options are also available at the duo's food cart The Wild Hunt, which opened in 2016.

In 2022, owners announced plans to move to a brick and mortar restaurant in southeast Portland's Woodstock neighborhood, occupying the space which previously housed El Gallo Taqueria. The restaurant opened on November 26.

Reception 
Nick Woo and Brooke Jackson-Glidden included Viking Soul Food in Eater Portlands 2021 "Guide to Portland's Most Outstanding Food Carts".

See also

 List of Black-owned restaurants
 List of Scandinavian restaurants

References

External links 

 
 Viking Soul Food at the Food Network
 Viking Soul Food at Lonely Planet
 Viking Soul Food at Zomato

2010 establishments in Oregon
Black-owned restaurants in the United States
European restaurants in Portland, Oregon
Food carts in Portland, Oregon
Restaurants established in 2010
Scandinavian restaurants in the United States
Southeast Portland, Oregon
Sunnyside, Portland, Oregon
Woodstock, Portland, Oregon